Cathryn ("Cathy") Hankla (born March 20, 1958) is an American poet, novelist, essayist and author of short stories. She is professor emerita of English and Creative Writing at Hollins University in Hollins, Virginia, and served as inaugural director of Hollins' Jackson Center for Creative Writing from 2008 to 2012.

Hankla is the author of more than a dozen books of poetry and prose. Her writing has been published in multiple journals and anthologies, including the Chicago Tribune, Ploughshares, Virginia Quarterly Review, The Missouri Review, Alaska Quarterly Review, Shenandoah, Denver Quarterly, Prairie Schooner, Passages North, A Cast Iron Aeroplane That Can Actually Fly: Contemporary Poets Comment on Their Prose Poems, and A Literary Field Guide to Southern Appalachia.

While at Hollins, Hankla was appointed Susan Gager Jackson Professor of Creative Writing (2012–2014). She twice chaired the university's English and Creative Writing department and taught courses in image/word, drawing, writing, cartooning, and filmmaking, in addition to literature and creative writing. Additionally, Hankla has held teaching appointments at Washington and Lee University (1989–1991), Randolph Macon Women's College (1987) and The University of Virginia (1985). She has served as Poetry Editor for The Hollins Critic, a literary journal, since 1996.

Life 
Hankla was born in the Appalachian town of Richlands, Virginia. She currently resides in Roanoke, Virginia and operates a painting studio. She collaborates with artists of various disciplines as part of her generative process. Much of her work is featured on cathrynhankla.com.

Publications 
Hankla's 14 books of poetry and prose include Lost Places: On Losing and Finding Home, Galaxies, Great Bear, Fortune Teller, Miracle Fish, Last Exposures: A Sequence of Poems, and Texas School Book Depository: Prose Poems.(See full list below).

Bibliography

Essays 

 Lost Places: On Losing and Finding Home. Mercer University Press. 2018.

Novels 

 The Land Between. Baskerville Publishers. 2003. 
 A Blue Moon in Poorwater. Ticknor and Fields. 1988. Reprinted University Press of Virginia. 1998.

Poetry 

 Immortal Stuff: Prose Poems. Mercer University Press. 2023. 
 Not Xanadu. Mercer University Press. 2022. 
 Galaxies. Mercer University Press. 2017. 
 Great Bear. Groundhog Poetry Press, LLC. 2016. 
 Last Exposures: A Sequence of Poems. Louisiana State University Press. 2004. 
 Poems for the Pardoned. Louisiana State University Press. 2002. 
 Emerald City Blues. Tryon Publishing Co. 2002. 
 Texas School Book Depository: Prose Poems. Louisiana State University Press. 2000. 
 Negative History. Louisiana State University Press. 1997. 
 Afterimages. Louisiana State University Press. 1991. 
 Phenomena. University of Missouri Press. 1983.

Short story collections 

 Fortune Teller Miracle Fish. Michigan State University Press. 2011. 
 Learning the Mother Tongue. University of Missouri Press. 1987.

Chapbooks and monographs 

 Imaginative Thinking: Expressive Writing and Drawing. Nancy Dahlstrom and Cathryn Hankla. Hollins University Press. 2003.
 Cool Water: An Interview and New Poems. Yarrow Chapbook Series. 1992.

Journal features 

 Hankla's poem "What Falls" featured in A Cast Iron Airplane That Can Actually Fly: Contemporary Poets Comment on Their Prose Poems. MadHat Press. 2019. 
 Hankla's poem "Two-Chambered Heart" featured in A Literary Field Guide to Southern Appalachia. University of Georgia Press. 2019.

Awards and recognition

Writing 
Among various other recognitions, Hankla has received a Virginia Commission for the Arts Fellowship in Poetry (1998), a PEN Syndicated Fiction Prize (for "Lost in Space," 1989), and the James Boatwright III Prize ( 2009) for her poem "Bee Tree." Her first book of poetry, Phenomena, reviewed by NPR as one of the five best collections of the year (1983), and her story collection Learning the Mother Tongue were both Breakthrough Series winners (1983, 1987).

Two volumes of Hankla's poetry have been finalists in the Library of Virginia Awards (Texas School Book Depository: Prose Poems (2001), and Great Bear (2017)). Her short story "Powerful Angels," originally published in Virginia Quarterly Review, was listed in Best American Short Stories''' "100 Other Distinguished Short Stories" (2001).

Hankla's early papers are archived at James Branch Cabell Library in Richmond, Virginia.

 Visual art 
Hankla’s geometric abstract paintings were included in Studio Visit (2009) and have been selected for national juried shows. Her paintings hang in private and corporate collections in Arizona, Colorado, Massachusetts, Michigan, North Carolina, Texas, and Virginia.

 Education 
Hankla attended Pulaski County High School in Dublin, Virginia, where she was involved with drama, band, filmmaking, and photography. She served as editor of the student literary magazine, Inklings''.

Hankla later received her Bachelor of Arts in English and Film from Hollins College in Hollins, Virginia (Hollins University, today) in 1980. She earned her Master of Arts in English and Creative Writing from Hollins in 1982.

Academic appointments 

 Chairperson, Department of English and Creative Writing, Hollins University (2016–2020).
 Director, MFA and Undergraduate Creative Writing, Jackson Center for Creative Writing, Hollins University (2008–2012).
 Coordinator, Graduate Teaching Fellows, Hollins University (2004–2007).
 Director, Graduate Teaching Fellows, Hollins University (2004–2005).
 Chair, Department of English, Hollins University (1995-1998).
 Chair, Imagination Studies Pathway, Hollins University (1991-1995).

References

External links 

  Writer's Voice interview with Cathryn Hankla
  Virginia Public Radio interview with Cathryn Hankla
  Huffington post review of Fortune Teller Miracle Fish

Hollins University alumni
Hollins University faculty
People from Richlands, Virginia
1958 births
Living people
American women poets
21st-century American novelists
20th-century American novelists
American women novelists
20th-century American women writers
21st-century American women writers
20th-century American poets
21st-century American poets
Novelists from Virginia
American women academics
Poets from Virginia
20th-century American academics
21st-century American academics